Yarim Qayeh (also Romanized as Yārīm Qayeh; also known as Yārem Qayeh, Yarim Ghayeh, Yarimqaya, and Yarymkaya) is a village in Dizaj Rural District, in the Central District of Khoy County, West Azerbaijan Province, Iran. At the 2006 census, its population was 357, in 75 families.

References 

Populated places in Khoy County